The Second Fiji expedition was an 1859 United States Navy operation against the native warriors of Seru Epenisa Cakobau on the island of Waya in Fiji. Following the death of two American traders on Waya, the Pacific Squadron launched a punitive expedition against the Wayans and defeated them in a pitched battle at the village of Somatti.

Background
In the summer of 1859, two American citizens on Waya were killed and cannibalized by the natives. When word of the incident reached the American consulate at Ovalau, the Pacific Squadron sent the sloop-of-war . The warship arrived at Ovalau on 2 October 1859 and it was decided that in order to get to Waya a vessel with a shallower draft was needed. To solve this problem Commander Sinclair chartered the schooner Mechanic and placed her under the command of veteran Lieutenant Charles Caldwell. A force of 10 marines, forty sailors and a 12-pounder howitzer were mustered for the landing on Waya.

A few Fijian guides and three American merchant sailors also participated. One of whom was Captain Josiah Knowles of the clipper ship Wild Wave which was wrecked off Oeno Island. Knowles and 40 others were marooned on the island until being rescued by Vandalia and taken to Fiji.

Expedition
The expedition left Ovalau on 6 October 1859 and sailed west around the northern end of the main island of Viti Levu to Waya. During their passage to the island, Lieutenant Caldwell’s men heard many stories from towns and villages about the warriors of Waya. A letter was also received from the Wayan chiefs responsible for the deaths of the two American traders. The message said, “Do you suppose we have killed the two white men for nothing? No, we killed them and we have eaten them. We are great warriors, and we delight in war.” Caldwell later wrote, “...and woe to the members of any strange tribe that falls into their hands... to be clubbed to death and eaten is the only alternative for the captive. It is not a matter of surprise that the tribes along our route learned with feelings of satisfaction the nature of our expedition.”

At 03:00 on 9 October, the Americans made a landing and marched inland toward the village of Somatti over tropical and mountainous terrain. While climbing through the mountains, the 12-pounder was destroyed and left behind when it fell  down the side of a hill as the expedition tried to pull it up.

When the column reached Somatti, it was daytime and over 300 native warriors were positioned in front of the village for defense. The Wayans wore white robes and were armed with clubs, rocks, spears, bows and some muskets. The Americans had swords and carbine rifles and the battle began when Lieutenant Caldwell ordered a flanking maneuver on the left side of the mass of warriors. This routed the natives and they dispersed themselves amongst the town or fled into the jungle. After, Master's Mate John K. Bartlett, who led a group of sailors, sang "Red, White and Blue" and let out three cheers before charging and capturing the village.

The crew of the 12-pounder, with no gun to fire, took charge of burning the village and over 115 huts were destroyed. Marines under Lieutenant Alan Ramsey participated by providing a rearguard for the sailors, they repulsed a final Wayan attack from the jungle after they had regrouped. In all fourteen warriors, including the two chiefs, were counted dead after a fierce half an hour battle. At least 36 others were wounded. Two marines were wounded by musketry but survived, two sailors were hurt badly by rocks, one other marine was hit in the leg with an arrow and a sailor from Wild Wave was hurt as well.

After the battle the Americans took until 16 October to return to the coast where the Mechanic was waiting. They stopped at friendly Fijian fishing villages and spread the news of their victory. Caldwell noted that two ramrods and one bayonet were lost during the march, and a large amount of ammunition was used in battle. The lieutenant received much credit for the operation which is considered one of the most impressive military campaigns launched by the United States in the South Pacific during the nineteenth century.

See also
Wilkes Expedition
Sumatran Expeditions
Korean Expedition
Formosan Expedition
Nukapu Expedition

Notes

References

Fiji expedition
1859 in the United States
1859 in Fiji
1859 in Oceania
Pacific Ocean
History of Fiji
United States Navy in the 19th century
Fiji expedition
Fiji